The 2007 Men's Hockey Champions Trophy was the 29th men's field hockey tournament for the Hockey Champions Trophy. It was held from November 29 to December 9, 2007, in Kuala Lumpur, Malaysia, having moved away from Lahore, Pakistan.

Teams
The teams are determined after the 2006 World Cup in Germany, based on the criteria set:
 (Hockey competition champion in 2004 Summer Olympics)
 (2006 Hockey World Cup Champion)
 (Fourth in 2006 Hockey World Cup)
 (defending champion)
 (Former host)
 (Third in 2006 Hockey World Cup)
 (host)
 (Invitee)

Squads

Head Coach: Barry Dancer

Jamie Dwyer
Liam de Young
Robert Hammond
Nathan Eglington
Mark Knowles
Russell Ford
Eddie Ockenden
David Guest
Luke Doerner
Grant Schubert
Bevan George
Andrew Smith
Stephen Lambert (GK)
Matthew Naylor
Aaron Hopkins
Matthew Wells
Travis Brooks
Brent Livermore (c)
Dean Butler
Daniel McPherson (GK)

Head Coach: Markus Weise

Christian Schulte (GK)
Philip Witte
Maximilian Müller
Sebastian Biederlack
Carlos Nevado
Christoph Menke
Moritz Fürste
Jan-Marco Montag
Sebastian Draguhn
Tobias Hauke
Tibor Weißenborn
Benjamin Weß
Niklas Meinert
Timo Weß (c)
Oliver Korn
Max Weinhold (GK)
Matthias Witthaus
Florian Keller
Oliver Hentschel
Niklas Emmerling

Head Coach: Jason Lee

Alistair McGregor (GK)
Glenn Kirkham
Richard Alexander
Richard Mantell
Ashley Jackson
Simon Mantell
Stephen Dick
Matthew Daly
Brett Garrard (c)
Jonty Clarke
Rob Moore
Ben Hawes
Niall Stott
Alistair Wilson
Barry Middleton
James Tindall
Jon Bleby
Mark Ralph
Ben Marsden
James Fair (GK)

Head Coach: Cho Myung-jun

Ko Dong-sik (GK)
Kim Sam-seok
Kim Chul
Kim Joung-goo
Oh Dae-keun
Lee Nam-yong
Seo Jong-ho (c)
Kang Seong-jung
Kim Byung-hoon
You Hyo-sik
Hong Sung-kweon
Cha Jong-bok
Lee Myung-ho (GK)
Hong Eun-seong
Jin Kyung-min
Kang Moon-kweon
Yeo Woon-kon
Lee Seung-il
Lee Jae-won
Jang Jong-hyun

Head Coach: Sarjit Singh

Khairulnizam Ibrahim (GK)
Baljit Sarjab
Chua Boon Huat
Baljit Singh Charun
Azrafiq Megat
Selvaraju Sandrakasi
Jiwa Mohan
Mohd Nor Madzli
Malek Engku
Shahrun Abdullah
Sukri Mutablib
Nabil Noor
Azlan Misron (c)
Jivan Mohan
Kumar Subramaniam (GK)
Razie Rahim
Kevinder Makbul
Hafifi Hanafi
Ismail Abu
Tengku Ahmad

Head Coach: Roelant Oltmans

Guus Vogels (GK)
Wouter Jolie
Geert-Jan Derikx
Rob Derikx
Thomas Boerma
Ronald Brouwer
Taeke Taekema
Jeroen Delmee (c)
Teun de Nooijer
Floris Evers
Rob Reckers
Matthijs Brouwer
Jeroen Hertzberger
Quirijn Caspers
Wouter Hermkens
Timme Hoyng
Robert van der Horst
Klaas Vermeulen
Jaap Stockmann (GK)
Rogier Hofman

Head Coach: Manzoor Manzoor-Ul-Hassan

Salman Akbar (c, GK)
Zeeshan Ashraf
Muhammad Imran
Imran Khan
Adnan Maqsood
Dilawar Hussain
Muhammad Waqas
Waqas Akbar
Shakeel Abbasi
Muhammad Arshad
Abbas Haider Billgrami
Nasir Ahmed (GK)
Muhammad Ali
Ghazanfar Ali
Inayat Ullah
Akhtar Ali
Muhammad Shabbir
Sajjad Anwar
Muhammad Kamran
Muhammad Afzal

Head Coach: Maurits Hendriks

Santi Freixa
Jordi Clapes
Francisco Fábregas (c)
Franc Dinares
Alex Fàbregas
Pol Amat
Eduard Tubau
Juan Fernández
Ramón Alegre
Víctor Sojo
Xavier Ribas
Albert Sala
Rodrigo Garza
Sergi Enrique
Eduard Arbós
Quico Cortes (GK)
David Alegre
Roc Oliva
Marc Salles
Xavier Castillano (GK)

Results
All times are Malaysian Standard Time (UTC+08:00)

Pool

Classification

Seventh and eighth place

Fifth and sixth place

Third and fourth place

Final

Awards

Final standings

References

External links
Official FIH website

Champions Trophy (field hockey)
C
H
2007